is a train station on the Kagoshima Main Line operated by JR Kyushu in Ōnojō, Fukuoka prefecture, Japan.

Lines 

Layout 
The station consists of two opposed side platforms serving two tracks at grade.

Platforms

Environs 
 water fort- a very early Japanese castle dating from 664 AD.
Minami-Fukuoka Driving School
Shimoōri Station (Nishitetsu Tenjin Ōmuta Line)

Adjacent stations 

|-
|colspan=5 style="text-align:center;" |Kyūshū Railway Company

History
The station was opened by Japanese Government Railways (JGR) on 21 September 1913 as an additional station on the existing Kagoshima Main Line track. With the privatization of Japanese National Railways (JNR), the successor of JGR, on 1 April 1987, JR Kyushu took over control of the station.

References

External links
Mizuki Station (JR Kyushu)

Railway stations in Fukuoka Prefecture
Railway stations in Japan opened in 1913